Maria Vitalyevna Verchenova (born 27 March 1986) is a Russian professional golfer. She is the first Russian to become a full-time member of the Ladies European Tour. She has several top-10 finishes. She competed under her married name Maria Balikoeva from 2012 to 2015.

Verchenova qualified for the 2016 Summer Olympics.  She shot a course record 62 in the 4th round and finished tied for 16th place.

Amateur wins
2004 Russian Amateur
2005 Latvian Amateur, Slovenian Amateur 
2006 Russian Amateur, Austrian Amateur

Source:

References

External links

Russian female golfers
Ladies European Tour golfers
Olympic golfers of Russia
Golfers at the 2016 Summer Olympics
Sportspeople from Moscow
1986 births
Living people